Slidre is a former municipality in the old Oppland county, Norway. The  municipality existed from 1838 until its dissolution in 1849 when it was divided into Vestre Slidre Municipality and Øystre Slidre Municipality. The administrative centre was the village of Slidre.

History
The prestegjeld of Slidre was established as a civil municipality on 1 January 1838 (see formannskapsdistrikt law). The municipality did not exist very long. On 1 January 1849, the municipality was divided into Vestre Slidre Municipality (population: 3,130) and Øystre Slidre Municipality (population: 2,406).

Name
The municipality (and the parish) were named after the old Slidre farm ( or ) since this was the location of the first Slidre Church that was built during the 12th century. The meaning of the name is not definitively known. It could be derived from the word slir which means the narrow depression through which a river runs.

See also
List of former municipalities of Norway

References

Vestre Slidre
Øystre Slidre
Former municipalities of Norway
1838 establishments in Norway
1849 disestablishments in Norway